Liverpool Girls High School (LGHS) is a public high school for girls in Liverpool, Sydney, New South Wales, Australia. It was established in 1954.

Many of its students come from a background of socio-economic disadvantage, with over 89 percent from a language background other than English.

References

External links 
 

Liverpool, New South Wales
Public high schools in Sydney
Girls' schools in New South Wales
Educational institutions established in 1954
1954 establishments in Australia